Anguilla is a settlement on the island of Saint Croix in the United States Virgin Islands. It is located immediately east of Henry E. Rohlsen Airport.

References

Populated places in Saint Croix, U.S. Virgin Islands